The decade of the 1050s in art involved some significant events.

Events
 1050: End of the Macedonian art period of Byzantine art

Paintings

Births
 1050: Li Tang – Chinese landscape painter (died 1130)
 1051: Mi Fu – Chinese painter of misty landscapes, poet, and calligrapher during the Song Dynasty (died 1107)

Deaths
 1057: Jōchō – Japanese sculptor of the Heian period (b. unknown)
 1051/1053: Xu Daoning – Chinese painter of the Song Dynasty (born 970)

Art
Years of the 11th century in art